Los Cochinos ("The Pigs") is a 1973 comedy album recorded by Cheech & Chong. The Spanish term cochino is a derogatory way of referring to a pig, as it also means "dirty", in contrast to cerdo, a more neutral word for a pig as an animal. In this context, "cochino" ("[dirty] pig") equates to the American derogatory term "pig" for "policeman".

Packaging

The album cover of Los Cochinos had concept origination, design and art direction by Peter Corriston. The package design was nominated for a Grammy award. The first production release of this album on long playing vinyl was an example of the elaborate album art of the era.  The packaging of the first release included a die cut cover showing a car door, and another die cut cardboard inner cover showing the usually sealed parts of a car door (which contained baggies of marijuana); the cardboard edge of the opening of the cover was cut decoratively around the windshield in the upper right corner. Subsequent re-pressings of the recording have not replicated the die-cut packaging.

The credits and track listing consisted of a black and white photograph of hand written graffiti also on a car door (four pairs of feet suggestively situated in the driver's side window) enclosed on a single sheet in the album.  Additional graffiti includes the early 1970s arithmetic statement:

  2 Good + 2 Be  4 Gotten,

a "↑ Made in U.S.A."
and the classic "Wash Me!"

Reception and performance

In a review of the album published in Rolling Stone, Janet Maslin found Cheech and Chong's humor to be running thin by this point, asking, "is this really the best we can do for comedy? (...) There's nothing funny about it." Nevertheless, the album not only matched the chart performance of Big Bambu by reaching #2 on the Billboard Albums Chart, but also earned the duo their one and only Grammy for Best Comedy Recording at the 16th Grammy Awards.

Track listing
All material written by Thomas Chong and Cheech Marin.

Personnel 
 Guitar – George Harrison
 Bass – Klaus Voormann
 Organ – Billy Preston
 Electric Piano – Carole King
 Piano – Nicky Hopkins
 Horns – Dick "Slyde" Hyde, George Bohanon, Paul Hubinon 
 Percussion – Jim Keltner
 Drums – Jim Karsten
 Saxophone – Tom Scott
 Cheerleaders (The Blossoms: Darlene Love, Fanita James, Jean King and Michelle "Trixie" Phillips)
 Written-By – Cheech Marin, Thomas Chong except "Basketball Jones by Tyrone Shoelaces and Rap Brown Jr. H.S. Band".

Production 
 Producer – Lou Adler 
 Engineer – Norm Kinney 
 Recorded By [All Recording-Studio-Live-Mixing And More], Mixed By – Bongo Norm Kinney
 Artwork [Collages] – Paul Zammit 
 Artwork [Tinting] – Andy Reichline, Reed Hutchinson 
 Design – Peter Corriston 
 Photography By – Ed Caraeff

"Evelyn Woodhead Speed Reading Course"
This track is a parody of the numerous speed reading courses available in the United States in the 1960s and 1970s, written by Cheech and Chong. The title specifically refers to the Evelyn Wood course.

Voiced by Cheech Marin, the piece begins with the words delivered phonetically:

The short spoken word testimonial style skit was an efficient parody of commercials that were prevalent on the television and radio stations in that era.

"Basketball Jones"
The album's final track, "Basketball Jones featuring Tyrone Shoelaces", is a music track which features George Harrison on guitar, Carole King, Billy Preston, Jim Keltner, Klaus Voormann, Nicky Hopkins, Jim Karstein and Tom Scott, with Darlene Love, Fanita Jones, Jean King, Ronnie Spector and Michelle Phillips (The Mamas & the Papas) as cheerleaders. 
Animated in 1974, parts of this music video were featured in the 1979 movie Being There.  This track was also released as a single and reached #15 on the Billboard Hot 100 and #36 in Canada.

References 

 Personnel & Production : https://www.discogs.com/fr/Cheech-Y-Chong-Los-Cochinos/release/1604635

1973 albums
Cheech & Chong albums
Albums produced by Lou Adler
Grammy Award for Best Comedy Album
Ode Records albums
Warner Records albums
1970s comedy albums